Kennekuk is an unincorporated community in Atchison County, Kansas, United States.

History
Kennekuk was platted in 1858. It was named for Kennekuk, a Kickapoo medicine man.

A post office was opened in Kennekuk in 1857, and remained in operation until it was discontinued in 1900.

References

Further reading

External links
 Atchison County maps: Current, Historic, KDOT

Unincorporated communities in Atchison County, Kansas
Unincorporated communities in Kansas
1858 establishments in Kansas Territory